"Finest Hour" is a song by American EDM trio Cash Cash featuring Moroccan singer-songwriter Abir. It was released on April 12, 2018 by Big Beat.

Background
In an interview, Cash Cash mentioned: '"Finest Hour" is about when you lose control at some point, when things aren't working out as planned. Maybe it's not getting that promotion, or getting fired, or losing someone'. And Abir said: "Finest Hour" is about reaching a breaking point and owning it. Everyone has days where nothing seems to go right but recognizing that it's just a moment and shit happens is what's most important.

Music video
The video was uploaded on July 17, 2018. Beginning with a couple at the start of their relationship, and follows them throughout their finest hours of their courtship, highlighting milestones as their family grows.

Other versions
On September 14, 2018, Abir released her solo acoustic version, after she signed to Atlantic Records.

Charts

Weekly charts

Year-end charts

Certifications

References

2018 singles
2018 songs
Cash Cash songs
Big Beat Records (American record label) singles